The 2007 US Open girls' doubles was an event that was won by Ksenia Milevskaya and Urszula Radwańska, they defeated Oksana Kalashnikova and Ksenia Lykina in the final, 6–1, 6–2.

Seeds

Draw

Finals

Top half

Bottom half

External links 
 Draw

Girls' Doubles
US Open, 2007 Girls' Doubles